José Antonio Labordeta Subías (10 March 1935, in Zaragoza, Aragon, Spain – 19 September 2010, Zaragoza, Aragon, Spain) was a Spanish (Aragonese) singer, songwriter, poet, writer and political activist. He was described by The Gran Enciclopedia Aragonesa 2000 (Great Aragonese Encyclopedia) as "The most important Aragonese singer-songwriter". He began singing in an attempt to give more relevance to his poetry; his songs are well-known and beloved anthems in Aragón. Poetic songs such as "Aragón", "Canto a la Libertad" (Song for Freedom) or "Me dicen que no quieres" (They tell me you don't want to) were also sung all around Spain.

He was also the founder of the Andalán newspaper, which was very influential during the 1970s. From 2000 until retiring in 2008, he represented Zaragoza in the Spanish Congress for Chunta Aragonesista (Aragonese Union), an Aragonese political party.

Biography

José Antonio Labordeta was born in Zaragoza, Aragón, in 1935. In 1953, his father died. José Antonio went to live with his older brother Miguel, who was married and fourteen years his senior.

In 1963, Labordeta married Juana de Grandes, and the newly wed couple moved to Teruel. Two of their daughters, Ana and Ángela, were born while the couple was living there.

He died on 19 September 2010 in Zaragoza at age 75 after a long battle with prostate cancer.

Discography

Books

References

External links
https://web.archive.org/web/20060813082346/http://www.fonomusic.es/labordeta.html
José Antonio Labordeta www.zaragozame.com/labordeta (Spanish)

1935 births
2010 deaths
People from Zaragoza
Members of the 7th Congress of Deputies (Spain)
Members of the 8th Congress of Deputies (Spain)
20th-century Spanish musicians
Chunta Aragonesista politicians